Koivula is a Finnish surname. Notable people with the surname include:

 Ritva Koivula (born 1933), Finnish swimmer
 Ilkka Koivula (born 1966), Finnish actor
 Heli Koivula Kruger (born 1975), Finnish track and field athlete
 Jussi Koivula (born 1983), Finnish professional boxer
 Otto Koivula (born 1998), Finnish professional ice hockey forward

Finnish-language surnames